Claudia Rouaux (born 13 October 1963) is a French politician. 

Member of the Socialist Party, she was elected a municipal councillor for the canton of Montfort-sur-Meu in 2001 and maintained her mandate for 19 years. In 2010, she was elected as a regional councillor for Brittany. She became in the Deputy for Ille-et-Vilaine's 3rd constituency following the death of François André. 

She was re-elected in the 2022 French legislative election as a PS (NUPES) candidate.

Biography
She was elected municipal councillor in Montfort-sur-Meu in 2001, as Victor Préauchat's first assistant, then re-elected in 2008. She was the substitute candidate for Marcel Rogemont as
a (later dissenting) socialist candidate for Ille-et-Vilaine's 3rd constituency in the 2007 election.   She was a candidate for the socialists in the 2008 cantonal elections in the canton of Montfort-sur-Meu; with 46% of the vote, she was beaten in the second round by Christophe Martins.

She was the substitute candidate for François André for Ille-et-Vilaine's 3rd constituency in the 2017 election. She succeeded André following his death.

External links
 Her page on the site of the National Assembly

References

Living people
1963 births
People from Maine-et-Loire
21st-century French women politicians

Women members of the National Assembly (France)
Deputies of the 15th National Assembly of the French Fifth Republic
Deputies of the 16th National Assembly of the French Fifth Republic
Members of Parliament for Ille-et-Vilaine